Anukokunda Oka Roju is a 2005 Indian Telugu-language neo-noir mystery-thriller film written and directed by Chandra Sekhar Yeleti and produced by Gangaraju Gunnam and Venkat Dega. The film stars Jagapathi Babu, Charmy and Shashank with the music composed by M. M. Keeravani.

The film received critical acclaim and won two Nandi Awards (including Second Best Feature Film), a Filmfare Award South, and a Santosham Film Award. It was remade as Sunday (2008) in Hindi language.

Plot 
The film starts with some people following a little boy coming from school. It is revealed to be ex-inspector Suresh Reddy (Jagapathi Babu) with his colleagues busting a drug smuggler, but he later takes a bribe from him. On the other hand, Sahasra (Charmi) is a chorus singer struggling to make a career in playback singing.

One night she attends a rave at the behest of her friend. The next day, life seems as usual for Sahasra. However, she is oblivious to one small detail: the next day is the day after. She is also completely unaware of what happened during that one missing day.

She realizes that something is amiss only when, a few days later, she is chased by unidentified men who try to assassinate her. Meanwhile, she meets Rajesh, (Shashank) a cab driver who tells her she should give him the money back, and Suresh himself when she gets attacked by an unknown person. He reveals that he knew her and her family as they set him a marriage proposal but later rejected him when she gets a photo of her in his car. She hears something strange from her audio recorder which she believes she never said, she also gets weird dreams and gets attacked -

 at the theatre when she was going to see Shankar Dada M.B.B.S. with children in her flat
 near a clinic
 near a shop
 and in Rajesh's house by his brother (Vasu Inturi) himself.

They also find a strange symbol. Suresh helps Sahasra in every way he could. At last, the mystery of the symbol is revealed in a flashback in 1997 when Suresh was an inspector, he meets Surya Swami (Pavan Malhotra), who practices black magic. Suresh beats him on the spot. The night when Sahasra was drunk, she reaches the ashram of Surya Swami unknowingly and disturbs the practices.

That day is when the devotees of Surya Swami are about to die according to black magic. A man, with whom intoxicated Sahasra traveled in another car after Rajesh's trip, is killed while saving her.

At last, she is kidnapped by Surya Swami's men and is about to be killed. Ultimately, she is saved by Machavarapu Abbulu (Narsing Yadav), a theatre actor, the witness of Sahasra traveling in Rajesh's car.

At the end of the movie, it is revealed that in the early hours of the missing day, an old man at Sahasra's apartment found her dizzy in the street when he was going to a medical shop as he had a headache since the previous night. and took her to the house. Thus, the puzzle of the missing one-day mystery is solved.

Cast

 Jagapati Babu as Inspector Suresh Reddy
 Charmy as Sahasra 
 Shashank as Rajesh
 Pavan Malhotra as Surya Swamy, a Tantrik
 Harsha Vardhan as Shankar Rao MA BEd, a tuition teacher 
 Narsing Yadav as Machavarapu Abbulu
 Kaushal Manda as Bojo's friend
 Ravi Prakash as Mahesh
 Amit Tiwari as Bhaskar "Bojo"
 Vasu Inturi as Rajesh's brother
 Surya
 Pooja Bharati as Swetha, Sahasra's friend
 Sivannarayana Naripeddi as Sahasra's father
 Giridhar
 Viswa Mohan
 Gopi Kaasi Reddy
 Sravan
 Srinivas
 Praveen
 Bhagawaan
 Dhulipala Nagendra
 Satish Bathula
 Srikanth
 Sivam
 C. V. L. Narasimha Rao
 Jagga Rao
 Shanoor Sana as Doctor
 Sandra
 Jayalakshmi
 Baby Rupika
 Baby Annie as Child Tuition Student
 Kamal Kamaraju as Kamal, Surya Swamy's follower

Soundtrack

The music was composed by M.M. Keeravani. The soundtrack was released on ADITYA Music Company.

Awards 
The film has won the following awards:

Nandi Awards - 2005
 Second Best Feature Film - Silver - Gangaraju Gunnam
 Best Screenplay Writer - Chandra Sekhar Yeleti

Filmfare Awards
 Best Female Playback Singer - Telugu - Smita

Santosham Film Awards
 Best Actress - Charmy

Release
The film was released with 24 prints in Andhra Pradesh and two prints in the U.S.A. Producer Gangaraju mentioned in an interview that the film was made on a budget of ₹2.9 crore and that they incurred a loss of ₹90 lakh on the film.

References

External links

2005 films
Films scored by M. M. Keeravani
Indian mystery thriller films
2000s mystery thriller films
Films about drugs
Telugu films remade in other languages
Films set in 1997
Films set in the 1990s
Films set in the 20th century
2000s Telugu-language films
Indian neo-noir films
Films directed by Chandra Sekhar Yeleti